A list of films produced in Egypt in 1999. For an A-Z list of films currently on Wikipedia, see :Category:Egyptian films.

External links
 Egyptian films of 1999 at the Internet Movie Database
 Egyptian films of 1999 elCinema.com

Lists of Egyptian films by year
1999 in Egypt
Lists of 1999 films by country or language